A. M. Krishnamurthy is an Indian politician and was member of the Bharatiya Janata Party until he joined All India Anna Dravida Munnetra Kazhagam in 2006. Krishnamurthy was a member of the Puducherry Legislative Assembly from the Reddiarpalayam constituency in Ozhukarai taluk, Puducherry district from 2001 to 2006. He was First elected MLA of Bharatiya Janata Party in Puducherry Legislative Assembly.

References 

All India Anna Dravida Munnetra Kazhagam politicians
Puducherry MLAs 2001–2006
Living people
Puducherry politicians
Year of birth missing (living people)